Breno Lopes may refer to:
Breno Lopes (footballer, born 1990), Brazilian football leftback
Breno Lopes (footballer, born 1996), Brazilian football forward